Bodmin is an unincorporated community in Saskatchewan.

Big River No. 555, Saskatchewan
Unincorporated communities in Saskatchewan
Division No. 16, Saskatchewan